John Thomas Averill (March 1, 1825 – October 3, 1889) was a United States Army officer in the American Civil War who later became a U.S. congressional representative from Minnesota.

Early life and education
Averill was born in Alna, Maine, March 1, 1825. He moved with his parents to Montville, Maine, in 1838 and graduated from the Maine Wesleyan Seminary at Readfield in 1846. He taught school for a short time, and subsequently engaged in lumbering for one year. Averill then moved to Winthrop, Maine, and engaged in mercantile pursuits for three years. In 1852 he moved to northern Pennsylvania and again engaged in lumbering until 1857, when he settled in Lake City, Minnesota. Once there, he engaged in mercantile pursuits and the grain business; was a member of the Minnesota Senate 1858–1860.

Career
On August 22, 1862, Averill was commissioned as a lieutenant colonel of the 6th Minnesota Infantry Regiment. He was promoted to colonel on November 22, 1864, and was assigned as Provost Marshal General for the District of Minnesota. He was honorably mustered out on September 28, 1865; and was made a brevet brigadier general on October 18, 1865.

In 1866, he moved to St. Paul, Minnesota, and engaged in the wholesale paper and stationery business. He was a member of the Republican National Committee from 1868 through 1880; elected as a Republican to the 42nd and 43rd congresses (March 4, 1871 – March 3, 1875); He was chairman of the Committee on Indian Affairs (Forty-third Congress); was not a candidate for renomination in 1874.

Later life and death
Averill resumed his business activities in St. Paul, Minnesota, where he died on October 3, 1889; interred at the Oakland Cemetery.

He is the namesake of the community of Averill, Minnesota.

References

External links 

1825 births
1889 deaths
Republican Party Minnesota state senators
People from Alna, Maine
Republican Party members of the United States House of Representatives from Minnesota
19th-century American politicians
Union Army colonels
People from Montville, Maine
People from Lake City, Minnesota
Businesspeople from Saint Paul, Minnesota
People of Minnesota in the American Civil War
19th-century American businesspeople